Herbert Leslie Greener (February 13, 1900 - December 8, 1974) was a soldier, writer, journalist, and egyptologist. He was born in Constantia, South Africa.  He studied at Felsted School from 1914 to 1917, then Sandhurst, before joining the Indian Army.

He wrote about his time as a prisoner of the Japanese while serving in the Australian Army during World War II.

His first marriage was to painter Rhona Haszard. The couple lived on the premises of Victoria College in Alexandria, Egypt, where he taught art and French.

He lived in Hobart, Tasmania.

Published works
Moon Ahead, Viking Press, New York (1951) hb/William Pène du Bois
The Wizard Boatman of the Nile and Other Tales from Egypt, George G Harrap, London (1957)
High Dam over Nubia (1962)
The Discovery of Egypt (1966)
No Time to Look Back, Victor Gollancz, 1950

References

1900 births
1974 deaths
Australian soldiers
Australian journalists
Australian Egyptologists